Bril may refer to:
Bril, a surname
Bril (unit), an old and deprecated photometric unit of luminance

See also
Brill (disambiguation)
Brühl (disambiguation)
Brüll, a surname